Alando Nicholas Atkinson is an English former professional footballer.

Career
In his youth, he was part of the Kuala Lumpur youth soccer program, and went abroad to start his career at the EduKick Madrid soccer academy at age 15.

ATM eventually annulled his contract as M-League rules state that a foreign import has to have played in a country's second tier. One year later, Balestier Khalsa offered him a one-week trial. He impressed the club management, and they signed him for a half-year deal in 2014. Ultimately, he was handed his first-team debut in a 2-2 cup tie away at DPMM.

Ever since his football contract ended in 2014, he is working as an instructor for the workout institution Flycycle and did advertising work for watch manufacturer TAG Heuer in March 2017.

Statistics

References

External links
 EduKick Madrid Interview

English footballers
Singapore Premier League players
Association football midfielders
Living people
Year of birth missing (living people)
Place of birth missing (living people)
Balestier Khalsa FC players
Expatriate footballers in Spain
Expatriate footballers in Singapore